The AeroVelo Atlas is a human-powered helicopter (HPH) that was built for AHS International's Igor I. Sikorsky Human Powered Helicopter Competition. On 13 June 2013, it became the first aircraft to achieve the goals of the competition and thus won the prize.

Design and development

AeroVelo, a team of students and graduates of the University of Toronto, began flight testing its Atlas quad rotor HPH on 28 August 2012. The core team of AeroVelo is the same group that created Snowbird, the first successful human-powered ornithopter.

Todd Reichert, the pilot and a racing cyclist, had specifically trained for such a power profile. The design specifically took advantage of the ground effect possible by the altitude required to win the prize.

Control was created by leaning the bike, which flexed the entire helicopter frame, tilting the rotor axes.

Operational history
The AeroVelo Atlas HPH made its first flight on 28 August 2012.

Data from that flight was submitted to AHS International. After this was reviewed by its panel of vertical flight technical experts, AHS International announced that the flight had met the requirements of the competition and that AeroVelo had officially won the $250,000 prize on 11 July 2013.

A section was donated to the New England Air Museum in 2017.

Specifications

See also

References

External links

Human-powered aircraft
Quadrotors
Atlas
2010s Canadian experimental aircraft
Aircraft first flown in 2012
University of Toronto
Quadcopters